Estadio Municipal de Riazor, also known as Estadio ABANCA-RIAZOR for sponsorship reasons, is an all-seater stadium in A Coruña, Spain. The stadium is the home of Deportivo de La Coruña, and accommodates a total of 32,660 spectators, making it the 13th-largest stadium in Spain and the largest in Galicia.

History
Although the stadium has hosted home games for Deportivo since its establishment in 1906, it wasn't until 1944 that essential facilities such as stands and changing rooms were installed . The initial field size was 105x74 meters, comparing to current 105x68. That year, the stadium was officially adopted as Deportivo's ground. The opening game was against Valencia CF on 28 October 1944, which saw Depor lose 3–2.

The stadium was renovated in time to host three games during the 1982 FIFA World Cup finals. Also, this asset made Riazor favorable for a Copa del Rey final between Real Madrid and RCD Espanyol in 1947, which saw the capital's side claim their ninth cup title.

On 29 June 2017, the stadium was renamed as Abanca-Riazor after the sign of a sponsorship agreement between Abanca and Deportivo de La Coruña until 2025.

International matches

Spain national team matches

1982 FIFA World Cup
The stadium held three matches of Group 1, one of six groups in the group stage of the 1982 FIFA World Cup. The other Group 1 games were also held in Galicia, at Balaídos, Vigo.

References

External links
Riazor at rcdeportivo.es
Estadios de Espana 

Estadio Riazor
Buildings and structures in the Province of A Coruña
1982 FIFA World Cup stadiums
Football venues in Galicia (Spain)
Sports venues completed in 1944